Moses bar Kepha or Moses bar Cephas (Syriac Mushe bar Kipho; born in Balad in Nineveh, now  in Iraq, about the year 813; died at the age of ninety, in 903) was a writer and one of the most celebrated bishops of the Syriac Orthodox Church of the ninth century.

A biography of him, written by an anonymous Syriac writer, is preserved in one of the Vatican manuscripts, extracts from which are given by Asemani in his Bibliotheca Orientalis (II, 218f.). He was a monk and afterwards became bishop of three cities, Beth-Ramman, Beth-Kionaya and Mosul on the Tigris, assuming the name of Severus. For ten years he was the patriarchal periodeutes, or visitor, of the Diocese of Tagrit where he acquired a notable reputation and great fame among his fellow Christians. He was buried in the monastery of St. Sergius, situated on the Tigris, near his native city.


Principal writings
A Commentary on the Old and New Testaments, often quoted by Bar Hebraeus, and most of it still extant in manuscript form;
a treatise on predestination and free will, preserved in a manuscript in the British Museum (Add. 14,731);
a commentary on Aristotle's Dialectics, mentioned by Bar Hebraeus;
a commentary on the Hexameron in five books, preserved in the Bibliothèque Nationale de France (Syr. 241), a passage of which is translated into French by François Nau in his Bardésane l'astrologue (Paris, 1899), p. 59;
a Tractatus de Paradiso, in three parts, dedicated to his friend Ignatius. (The Syriac original of this work was thought lost, but a Latin version of it was published by Andreas Masius (Antwerp, 1569) under the title De Paradiso Commentarius.  However a Syriac manuscript has now been discovered at Yale)
A treatise on the soul, in forty chapters, with a supplementary essay on the utility of offering prayers and sacrifices for the dead. (This treatise is preserved in the Vatican Library; a German translation of it is given by O. Braun in his Moses Bar-Kepha und sein Buch von der Seele (Freiburg, 1891).)
A Tractatus de sectis, or, Liber disputationum adversus haereses (see Assemani, B.O. II, 57);
a treatise on the Sacraments;
a commentary on the Liturgy;
an ecclesiastical history.

His other works comprise discourses, homilies, and a commentary on the writings of St Gregory of Nazianzus.

References

Further reading
James F. Coakley, "Mushe bar Kipho", in Gorgias Encyclopedic Dictionary of the Syriac Heritage: Electronic Edition, edited by Sebastian P. Brock, Aaron M. Butts, George A. Kiraz and Lucas Van Rompay (Gorgias Press, 2011; online ed. Beth Mardutho, 2018).

External links
Peshitta in the Encyclopædia Britannica
Classical Syriac Manuscripts at Yale University: A Checklist in HUGOYE: JOURNAL OF SYRIAC STUDIES

810s births
903 deaths
9th-century Syriac Orthodox Church bishops
Writers of the medieval Islamic world
9th-century writers